Euronics International Ltd. is an international association of over 11,000 independent electrical retailers in 37 countries. It functions as a leading international electrical retail group on behalf of its members, and is based in Amsterdam. It operates as a European Economic Interest Grouping entity (an EEIG) meaning that all stores are independent sellers.

History 
Euronics International was founded in 1990 by five national groups from Germany, Italy, Spain, Belgium and the Netherlands. The groups realized at the time that they had to react to the structural changes brought about by globalization to remain competitive. At the same time they would preserve the advantages of specialising in the trade of mainly electronics by maintaining qualified employees, specialist knowledge and personal customer service.

The five groups formed an EEIG in order to have the flexibility of having separate businesses, as well as each business having local knowledge of their area, but the buying power and branding involved with having a single entity.

National Organisation 
The list of national organizations belonging to Euronics International Ltd. currently are:

Euronics in Italy 
Euronics Italia SpA represents Euronics International's second largest shareholder by turnover, second only to Germany. It is one of the largest groups in the distribution of household appliances and consumer electronics. Euronics Italia was formed in September 1999 from the GET brand, established in 1972, when the demand for household appliances, color televisions and hi-fi systems became increasingly significant.

The members of Euronics Italia 
Euronics Italia SpA is a group made up of 11 members distributed throughout Italy, including a total of 420 stores as of March 2018.

 Bruno SpA
 Butali SpA
 Castoldi Srl (which was admitted to the group in November 2018 by the Court of Monza to compensate creditors after an agreement was found with the company Binova, a subsidiary of the Nova consumer electronics group, this led to Euronics Italia taking over ten stores)
 Dimo SpA
 Galimberti SpA (which requested to join Euronics Italia as part of bankruptcy measures decided with the bankruptcy court of Milan in February 2018, providing for the closure of 11 stores, the maintenance of 11 stores as part of Euronics Italia and the sale of 6)
 The Via Lattea SpA
 Nova SpA
 Rimep SpA
 SIEM SpA
 Tufano SpA
 Binova

Diversification of brands 
Euronics is represented in Italy by four brands:

Turnover in Italy

Euronics in the Baltics 
Euronics entered the Estonian market in 2003 and is now represented by 19 stores. There are 6 Euronics stores in Latvia and 4 in Lithuania. There are a total of 29 Euronics brand stores operating in the Baltics.

The chain of Euronics stores also includes PlussMiinus stores, of which there is one in Estonia.

Euronics in Norway 
Euronics Norge AS is originally a Norwegian company headquartered in Fredrikstad. On January 1, 2016, Euronics Norge AS formally became a subsidiary of Swedish Elon Group AB.

The company operates consumer electronics and home appliances sales through 50 stores in Norway as of October 2018.

In January 2019, Euronics Norge changed its name to Elon.

Euronics in Finland 

Euronics in Finland is managed by the Merchant Cooperative Tekniset (Kauppiasosuuskunta Tekniset). There are almost 60 Euronics and Technical stores in Finland.

Evolution of the logo

References

External links
 Euronics International
 Euronics UK Electrical Stores 
 Euronics Ireland

Retail companies established in 1990
Companies based in Amsterdam
Retail trade associations